The 2012 Meretz leadership election was held on 7 February 2012. to elect the leader of the Meretz party. It saw a vote of delegates to the party's convention elected Zahava Gal-On as the party's leader.

Candidates
Zehava Gal-On, member of the Knesset since 1999 and candidate for party leadership in 2008
Ilan Gilon  Member of the Knesset (1999–2003 and since 2009)
Ori Ophir, Party activist and youth leader

Electorate
Unlike the previous two Meretz party leadership elections, the 2012 election was not open to the party's general membership. Instead, its electorate was limited to delegates at the party's convention. 835 of the convention's 954 delegates ultimately participated in the election, making for a turnout of 87.53%.

Results

References

Meretz leadership
Meretz leadership elections
Meretz
Meretz leadership election